The Americas Zone is one of the three zones of the regional Davis Cup competition in 2018.

In the Americas Zone there are three different tiers, called groups, in which teams compete against each other to advance to the upper tier. Winners in Group II advance to the Americas Zone Group I. Teams who lose their respective ties will compete in the relegation play-offs, with winning teams remaining in Group II, whereas teams who lose their play-offs will be relegated to the Americas Zone Group III in 2019.

Participating nations
Seeds: 

Remaining nations:

Draw

 and  relegated to Group III in 2019.
 promoted to Group I in 2019.

First round

Guatemala vs. Venezuela

El Salvador vs. Uruguay

Mexico vs. Puerto Rico

Bolivia vs. Peru

Second round

Uruguay vs. Venezuela

Mexico vs. Peru

Play-offs

Guatemala vs. El Salvador

Bolivia vs. Puerto Rico

Third round

Uruguay vs. Mexico

References

External links

Official Website

Americas Zone Group II
Davis Cup Americas Zone